The National Agency for Prevention of Corruption or NAPC is a national anti-corruption agency of the Ukrainian government which is responsible for shaping and implementing anti-corruption policy, while creating an environment conducive to corruption prevention. It has been functioning since 2016.

The agency is one of the three anti-corruption pillars of Ukraine, created after the Euromaidan revolution, along with the National Anti-Corruption Bureau of Ukraine (NABU) and the Specialized Anti-Corruption Prosecutor's Office (SAPO).

In contrast to NABU, which is a law-enforcement institution, NACP has a preventive function. As such, the Agency develops regulations that help prevent corruption and ensures compliance with them.

The candidates of the 2019 Ukrainian presidential election were required submit a declaration of income for the year preceding the year of the beginning of the election. This document will be scrutinized by the National Agency for Prevention of Corruption who will subsequently publish the results of the audit.

Heads of the National Agency for Prevention of Corruption
 Natalia Korchak (2015 - 2018)
Natalia Novak (acting) (2019)
Oleksandr Novikov (2019 - incumbent)

See also

References

Government agencies of Ukraine
Euromaidan
Corruption in Ukraine
Specialist law enforcement agencies of Ukraine
Anti-corruption agencies
2016 establishments in Ukraine
Government agencies established in 2016
Institutions with the title of National in Ukraine